Restaurant: Impossible is an American reality television series, featuring chef and restaurateur Robert Irvine, that originally aired on Food Network from 2011 to 2016. After a three-year hiatus, the show returned on April 20, 2019.

Show structure
The premise of the series is that within two days and on a materials budget of $10,000, Irvine renovates a failing American restaurant with the goal of helping to restore it to profitability and prominence. Irvine is assisted by an HGTV designer (usually Taniya Nayak, Cheryl Torrenueva, or Lynn Kegan, but sometimes Vanessa DeLeon, Krista Watterworth, Yvette Irene, or Nicole Faccuito), along with general contractor Tom Bury, who sometimes does double duty as both general contractor and designer. After assessing the problems with the restaurant, Irvine typically creates a plan for the new decor, oversees the refurbishment of the restaurant, calculates profitable  food costs, reduces the number of items on the menu and improves the quality of the entrees, develops a promotional activity, educates or resolves conflicts for the restaurant's owners, or trains the staff, as needed for each restaurant. As of February 2023, the show has completed missions in 42 states and the District of Columbia; remaining states are Alaska, Hawai'i, Iowa, Kansas, North Dakota, South Dakota, Utah, and Vermont.

Audience
On January 4, 2021, the show planned to move to Discovery+, with new episodes airing every Thursday. The move to the streaming platform was reversed in March 2021 due to negative viewer feedback, and now episodes will continue to premiere on Food Network for the near future.

Episodes

See also

Designed to Sell – previous show starring Taniya Nayak and Lynn Kegan
Dinner: Impossible – previous show starring Robert Irvine

References

External links

2010s American cooking television series
2010s American reality television series
2020s American cooking television series
2020s American reality television series
2011 American television series debuts
Food Network original programming
American television series revived after cancellation
Food reality television series